Robert 'Robbie' Blair (born 3 June 1953 in Johannesburg, South Africa) is a former South African rugby union player.

Playing career 
Blair matriculated at Grey College in Bloemfontein, after which he went to the University of Stellenbosch. In 1972, his first year at university, he was selected for the University's under–20 team and the next year he gained provincial under–20 colours for Western Province. He made his senior provincial debut for Western Province in 1974 and played 74 matches for the union from 1974 to 1980 and scored 858 points, which was the provincial record up to 1987. He played his 75th match for Western Province as a replacement in the last minutes of the 1984 Currie Cup final. From 1981 to 1983, Blair played for Transvaal and in 1983 he scored 223 points, a Transvaal record for a season, that was bettered in 1989 by Cameron Oliver.

Blair played his first and only test match for the Springboks against the World XV on 27 August 1977 at Loftus Versfeld in Pretoria. He scored 21 points in this match.

Test history

See also 

 List of South Africa national rugby union players – Springbok no. 494

References 

1953 births
Living people
South African rugby union players
South Africa international rugby union players
Western Province (rugby union) players
Rugby union players from Johannesburg
Rugby union fly-halves